688 Melanie (prov. designation:  or ) is a dark background asteroid from the central regions of the asteroid belt. It was discovered by Austrian astronomer Johann Palisa at the Vienna Observatory on 25 August 1909. Any reference to the origin of the asteroid's name is unknown.

Orbit and classification 

Melanie is a non-family asteroid of the main belt's background population when applying the hierarchical clustering method to its proper orbital elements. It orbits the Sun in the central asteroid belt at a distance of 2.3–3.1 AU once every 4 years and 5 months (1,618 days; semi-major axis of 2.7 AU). Its orbit has an eccentricity of 0.14 and an inclination of 10° with respect to the ecliptic. The body's observation arc begins at Vienna Observatory in July 1913, or four years after its official discovery observation.

Naming 

This minor planet was named in 1910, by Otto Prelinger who collaborated with Johann Palisa and Max Wolf on the photographic star charts (AN 186, 15). Any reference of this minor planet name to a person or occurrence is unknown.

Unknown meaning 

Among the many thousands of named minor planets, Melanie is one of 120 asteroids for which  has been published.

Physical characteristics 

In both the Bus-DeMeo classification and the Bus–Binzel SMASS classification, Melanie is a common, carbonaceous C-type asteroid.

Rotation period 

In September 2011, a rotational lightcurve of Melanie was obtained from photometric observations by Robert Stephens at the Santana Observatory  in California. Lightcurve analysis gave a well-defined rotation period of  hours with a low brightness variation of  magnitude. The first but unsuccessful attempt to measure the objects period was undertaken by Richard Binzel in June 1984.

Diameter and albedo 

The Collaborative Asteroid Lightcurve Link adopts the albedo obtained by IRAS and derives a diameter of 41.38 kilometers using an absolute magnitude of 10.59. These timed observations are taken when the asteroid passes in front of a distant star.

References

External links 
 Lightcurve Database Query (LCDB), at www.minorplanet.info
 Dictionary of Minor Planet Names, Google books
 Asteroids and comets rotation curves, CdR – Geneva Observatory, Raoul Behrend
 Discovery Circumstances: Numbered Minor Planets (1)-(5000) – Minor Planet Center
 
 

000688
Discoveries by Johann Palisa
Named minor planets
000688
19090825